Shha or He (Һ һ; italics: Һ һ) is a letter of the Cyrillic script. Its form is derived from the Latin letter H (H h h), but the capital forms are more similar to a rotated Cyrillic letter Che (Ч ч) or a stroke-less Tshe (Ћ ћ) because the Cyrillic letter En (Н н) already has the same form as the Latin letter H.

Most of the languages using the letter call it ha - the name shha was created when the letter was encoded in Unicode.

Computing codes

See also 

   - Shha with hook
 Ԧ ԧ - Shha with descender

References

External links
 Unicode definition

Tatar language